Why Am I?: The Science of Us (also known as Predict My Future: The Science of Us) is a 2016 New Zealand documentary series about the Dunedin Multidisciplinary Health and Development Study (also known as 'The Dunedin Study'), a long-running cohort study following 1037 people born in Dunedin, New Zealand during 1972 and 1973. The study revealed the result of the combined effects of hereditary (genes) and environment (upbringing) on how people turn out.

The series of four sixty minute episodes was made by Razor Films of Auckland, New Zealand, and screened on TV One from 31 May to 21 June 2016, with all four episodes available online on TVNZ On Demand.

The series follows the study and information it has provided in almost every field of medical and social development including respiratory and cardiovascular health, addictions, obesity, sexual health, cognitive neuroscience, psychiatry, genetics and criminology and the effects of nature and nurture on health and behaviour.

Episodes

External links  
 
 Why Am I? (TVNZ On Demand)
 Dunedin Multidisciplinary Health and Development Research Unit website

2016 New Zealand television series debuts
2016 New Zealand television series endings
New Zealand documentary television series
Science education television series
TVNZ 1 original programming
Health in New Zealand
Cohort studies